Selters is a village in the district Limburg-Weilburg, Hesse, Germany. It is situated at the Taunus side of the river Lahn and belongs to the municipality Löhnberg. The village has a total population of about 400 inhabitants.

The village is famous for its natural springs of carbonated mineral water, which is sold as Selters water.  In English, both Seltzer and Alka Seltzer refer to the toponym.

Location 

Löhnberg-Selters lies near Wiesbaden in direction to the Taunus mountains near the river Lahn and between Wetzlar and Limburg in Hesse.

History 

The ancient Romans (who occupied Germany between 50 B.C. and 475 AD) called the places where water emerged from underground Aqua Saltare for "dancing water."  This name was applied to the town and then borrowed into German as Selters.

Culture 

The organizations of the village (Protestant parish, volunteers fire department, youth and leisure club, Kyffhäuser comradeship, table tennis club, hikers, water-ski club, Paintball sports club and Quadclub) appear alternately as organizers of the annual celebrations. It starts with the round dance in February, followed by the bonfire lit on Easter Saturday in March/April, the wine celebration in June/July, the kermis in August, the lantern move and the potato celebration in November. Nicholas comes with his coach to bring the children presents in December.

External links 
Löhnberg-Selters Website

Towns in Hesse